Londonderry railway station, known commonly as Waterside railway station, is a railway terminus in Derry, Northern Ireland, on the east bank of the River Foyle, operated by Northern Ireland Railways.

History

The original Londonderry Waterside Station was opened on 29 December 1852 by Steven Alfred John Campbell, a well-known banker of the time. It was rebuilt into the current building by the Belfast & Northern Counties Railway in 1874.

Derry historically had four passenger termini. On the west side of the river, Graving Dock station served the Londonderry and Lough Swilly Railway and destinations to the west and Foyle Road station (which replaced the short-lived Cow Market station) served the Londonderry and Enniskillen Railway to Enniskillen via Strabane and Omagh. On the east side of the river, Victoria Road station served the alternative Donegal Railway Company (later Great Northern Railway) line to Strabane and Waterside station served the line to Belfast via the north coast. Although passenger trains terminated at these respective stations, all four railways were linked by freight lines through the city and the Craigavon Bridge.

As a result of a series of closures of the other lines, Waterside was the only station to have survived closure by 1965. Services were reduced and the track layout was severely rationalised. The line now consists of a single track with passing loops at Bellarena and Coleraine stations. The station name was changed to Londonderry, as the suffix Waterside became redundant upon closure of the city's two other railway termini. Although this is the station's official name the platform signs at the station read Derry~Londonderry while the destination signs on Northern Ireland Railways trains read Derry/Londonderry.

The station was damaged in two terrorist attacks in the 1970s forcing it to be closed on 24 February 1980. A third station of the same name replaced the larger terminus in 1980.

Prior to Derry becoming the inaugural UK City of Culture in 2013, the railway line was upgraded with relaid track, a track relay and sections of continuous welded rail 

In 2010, the Minister for Regional Development, Conor Murphy, mooted the possibility of building a new railway station that would connect the railway with a planned foot and cycle bridge across the Foyle, bringing it closer to the centre of the city.

On 6 October 2016, Translink confirmed that the railway would be returning to the former BNCR Waterside station which will be used as a new transport hub for the city. As part of this work, platform 2 was taken out of use in September 2018 and the block section to Bellarena converted to One Train Working operation. The 1980 station closed on 8 October 2019 to allow the completion of work on the new station on the former site just to the north.

The new station on the site of the old Waterside Station opened for rail traffic 21 October 2019. The 1980s station was demolished on 5 and 6 December 2019.

Design
The station uses the former train shed as a waiting room, café, and ticket hall for NIR services to and from Coleraine and Belfast. Two platforms are provided one on the river side of the former train shed, the other approximately on the site of the old arrival platform, with a siding adjacent to it for stabling empty stock.

The site of the former departure platform, next to the riverside greenway is unoccupied.

Services
Buses also serve the location which is being marketed as the North West Transport Hub.

See also

 Peace Bridge (Foyle)

References

External links 
NI Railways

Railway stations in County Londonderry
Buildings and structures in Derry (city)
Railway stations opened in 1852
Railway stations served by NI Railways
1852 establishments in Ireland
Railway stations in Northern Ireland opened in 1852